Luiken is a Dutch patronymic surname based on the archaic spelling Luik of the given name Luuk, a short form of Lucas, or on the equally archai name Lui (from Ludo or Ludolph). Among variants are Luijken, Luikens and Luyken. People with this surname include:

Jan Luyken (1649–1712), Dutch poet, illustrator and engraver
 (1742–1818), Dutch politician for the Batavian Republic
Leda Luss Luyken (born 1952), Greek-American conceptual artist
Nicole Luiken (born 1971), Canadian science fiction author
Otto Luyken (1884–1953), German gardener
Stefanie Luiken (born 1985), Dutch backstroke swimmer

See also
Luyckx, Dutch surname of the same origin
Luik, Estonian surname

References

Dutch-language surnames
Patronymic surnames